The Flying Cars was an attraction at Riverview Park in Chicago, Illinois, that was introduced in 1954.

The attraction consisted of a barrel with a track inside for cars to ride freewheeling. The cars were held onto the drum by a rail and floating clamp system. As the drum would spin, the single person cars would follow the track and eventually begin to go upside down. The drum steadily increased its speed and the cars would let it roll beneath their wheels as they followed the track. The operator of Flying Cars would spin the drum for two minutes and then release the brakes causing the cars to come to a complete stop while the drum slowed to a halt. In 1966, the four car ride overturned on the first embankment, seriously injuring several riders. There was also a fatality when someone failed to properly fasten their safety belt and was killed after falling out. The attraction was shut down due to safety concerns.

References

Amusement rides in the United States
Amusement rides introduced in 1954
Amusement rides that closed in 1966
Tourist attractions in Chicago